Doors Open Canada is a national program by Heritage Canada, based on the Doors Open Days concept. It aims to expose architecture and heritage through the exploration of hidden historical, architectural and cultural gems. Buildings that are normally closed to the public, or which charge an entrance fee, welcome visitors to look around for free.

The premier Doors Open event in Canada, in age and repetition, is Doors Open Ontario, which has run continuously since 2000. Since 2003, Doors Open Newfoundland and Labrador has been constantly growing, with new communities added each year.

Events
Doors Open events have been held in the following cities (first year indicated): 
 Doors Open Brampton, Ontario 2007
 Doors Open Brandon, Manitoba 2004
 Doors Open Brigus and Cupids, Newfoundland and Labrador 2005
 Doors Open Calgary, Alberta 2003
 Doors Open Conception Bay South, Newfoundland and Labrador 2006
 Doors Open Corner Brook, Newfoundland and Labrador 2006
 Doors Open Cornwall and Seaway Valley, Ontario 2003
 Doors Open Grimsby, Ontario 2011
 Doors Open Haldimand,(Ontario) 2011 - September 17)
 Doors Open Halifax 2013, 2014, 2015, 2016, 2017
 Doors Open London, Ontario 2002
 Doors Open Ottawa, Ontario 2002
 Doors Open Newtown, Newfoundland and Labrador 2004
 Doors Open Paris, Ontario 2005
 Doors Open Placentia, Newfoundland and Labrador 2005
 Doors Open Placentia 2004
 Doors Open Richmond, British Columbia 2004
 Doors Open Saskatoon, Saskatchewan 2005
 Doors Open St. John's, Newfoundland and Labrador 2003
 Doors Open Toronto, Ontario, 2000
 Doors Open Trinity Bight, Newfoundland and Labrador 2006
 Doors Open Victoria, British Columbia, 2008
 Doors Open Waterloo Region, Ontario 2003
 Doors Open Whitehorse, Yukon 2005
 Doors Open  Winnipeg, Manitoba 2006

References

External links
Doors Open Newfoundland and Labrador
Doors Open Cornwall and Seaway Valley
Doors Open Waterloo Region
Doors Open London
Doors Open Grimsby

Canada